Nekrolog 43 is an album by the music group Diary of Dreams. The album was released on November 6, 2007.

Track listing

References 

2007 albums
Diary of Dreams albums
Accession Records albums